Jo Anne Quiring (born October 8, 1963) is a former American judoka.

She competed in the 1991 Judo World Championship.

In the 1992 Olympics she competed for the United States in the women's half lightweight tying for 9th.

References

1963 births
Living people
American female judoka
Olympic judoka of the United States
Judoka at the 1992 Summer Olympics
Pan American Games medalists in judo
Pan American Games silver medalists for the United States
Pan American Games bronze medalists for the United States
Judoka at the 1987 Pan American Games
Judoka at the 1995 Pan American Games
21st-century American women